Moniriyeh Metro Station is a station in line 3 of the Tehran Metro. It is located in Moniriyeh Square.

References

Tehran Metro stations
Railway stations opened in 2013
2013 establishments in Iran